William Hudson Lindsay (April 15, 1905 – May 9, 2006), nicknamed "Red", was an American Negro league shortstop for the 1934 Bacharach Giants.

A native of Spartanburg, South Carolina, Lindsay graduated from Johnson C. Smith University, and is a member of the school's athletic hall of fame. Lindsay died in Philadelphia, Pennsylvania in 2007 at age 101.

References

External links
 and Seamheads
 William Lindsay at Negro Leagues Baseball Museum

1905 births
2006 deaths
Bacharach Giants players
Sportspeople from Spartanburg, South Carolina
Baseball players from South Carolina
Baseball shortstops
American centenarians
Men centenarians
20th-century African-American sportspeople
21st-century African-American people